Tropical Storm Amy was the first tropical cyclone to develop during the 1975 Atlantic hurricane season. Forming on June 28 from a trough of low pressure, Amy gradually attained tropical storm status off the coast of North Carolina. A rapidly approaching trough caused Amy to turn sharply eastward before the storm took a general northeastward track. On July 2, the storm reached its peak intensity with winds of 70 mph (110 km/h) and a barometric pressure of 981 mbar (hPa; 28.97 inHg). During most of the storm's existence, Amy featured many subtropical characteristics but was not classified as such due to the proximity to land. By July 4, the system moved southeast of Newfoundland before becoming extratropical.

On June 30, a schooner carrying four people capsized off the North Carolina coastline, resulting in the death of the father of the other three crew members. They remained at sea for roughly 15 days before being rescued by a Greek merchant ship.

Meteorological history
 
Tropical Storm Amy originated from a weak trough on June 24 accompanied by scattered showers and thunderstorms over Florida. The system tracked westward in response to an upper-tropospheric low over Georgia. By June 26, a surface circulation developed north of the Bahamas and satellite imagery showed a significant increase in convective activity and the National Hurricane Center (NHC) classified the system as a tropical depression early on June 27. On June 28, the system attained tropical storm-status while tracking north-northeast off the coast of North Carolina.

By June 29, a trough, moving through the westerlies, rapidly approached the storm, causing the newly designated Amy to turn sharply toward the east. Strong wind shear disorganized the system slightly, leading to Amy featuring subtropical characteristics. By the evening, the strongest winds were not located around the center, but were instead situated between 60 and 90 mi (95 and 140 km) from the center. Convection became displaced from the center of circulation but the storm continued to intensify. Over the following several days, Amy tracked generally northeastward but underwent eastward jogs in response to rapidly moving troughs to the north.

Amy neared hurricane intensity several times, beginning on June 30 as maximum winds increased to 70 mph (110 km/h); however, the storm was unable to acquire enough tropical features, and remained predominately subtropical. Gale-force winds at this time extended roughly 125 mi (210 km) out from the center to the north and east. Despite being subtropical at this point, the NHC decided against renaming it due to Amy's proximity to land. On July 2, a barometric pressure of 981 mbar (hPa; 28.97 inHg) was recorded, the lowest in relation to Amy. The following day, another trough caused the storm to accelerate northeastward. On July 4, Amy passed roughly 170 mi (270 km) southeast of Cape Race, Newfoundland before becoming an extratropical cyclone.

Preparations and impact

Rough seas from the storm resulted in minor coastal flooding and beach erosion in North Carolina. Small craft advisories were issued along the Virginia and North Carolina coastlines as waves up to  affected the region. Several beaches were closed due to the rough conditions. By July 2, the small craft advisories were discontinued as Amy tracked away from land. Although no warnings were issued, boaters in Newfoundland were advised to closely monitor the storm. In Hampton, Virginia, a funnel cloud spawned by a squall line associated with Amy formed just offshore.

As a tropical depression, Amy produced scattered rainfall in Florida, peaking around  near the Georgia border. Along the North Carolina coast, heavy rain fell as the center of Amy tracked nearby.

Offshore, a schooner carrying four people capsized in rough seas roughly 250 mi (400 km) east of Cape Hatteras, North Carolina on June 30. The four crew were a father and his three kids. A diabetic, the 30-year-old father searched for his insulin pen in the capsized ship; however, for the fifteen days they were stranded, he was unable to find it. During the event, he slipped into a coma and later died on July 4, leaving his kids on the boat. On July 14, the three kids were rescued by the Ellinora, a Greek merchant ship.

See also

1975 Atlantic hurricane season

References

External links
 HPC Rainfall page for 1975 tropical cyclones
 Monthly Weather Review

Amy
Amy (1975)
Amy (1975)
1975 in North Carolina